Hallomenus is a genus of polypore fungus beetles in the family Tetratomidae. There are about nine described species in Hallomenus.

Species
These nine species belong to the genus Hallomenus:
 Hallomenus arimotoi Toyoshima & Ishikawa, 2000
 Hallomenus axillaris (Illiger, 1807)
 Hallomenus binotatus (Quensel, 1790)
 Hallomenus debilis LeConte, 1866
 Hallomenus pallens Gyllenhal, 1817
 Hallomenus punctulatus LeConte, 1866
 Hallomenus reticulatus Motschulsky, 1872
 Hallomenus scapularis Melsheimer, 1846
 Hallomenus serricornis LeConte, 1878

References

Further reading

External links

 

Tenebrionoidea
Articles created by Qbugbot